Russell Harrison may refer to:

 Russell Harrison (broadcaster), New Zealand television presenter
 Russell Benjamin Harrison (1854–1936), American businessman, lawyer, diplomat, and politician